Max Leonard Miller (born November 13, 1988) is an American politician and former aide to Donald Trump. He is the U.S. representative for Ohio's 7th congressional district.

Early life and education 
Miller grew up in Northeast Ohio and graduated from Shaker Heights High School in 2007. He attended the University of Arizona before transferring to Cleveland State University, from which he received his bachelor's degree in 2013.

Early career 
Miller worked at a Lululemon store in Ohio before joining the Marine Reserve in 2013. He was a corporal and made no deployments. In 2019, he was transferred from the Selected Marine Corps Reserve to the Individual Ready Reserve.

Trump aide
After initially working for Marco Rubio's campaign for the 2016 Republican presidential nomination, Miller left the campaign in February 2016 and joined Donald Trump's 2016 presidential campaign. After working as a Trump campaign aide, Miller became a political appointee in the Trump administration. He was a confidential assistant in the United States Department of the Treasury in 2017, then a lead advance representative in the White House Office, and then associate director of the Presidential Personnel Office and special assistant to the president. In June 2020, Miller was among the aides who accompanied Trump on his photo op at St. John's Church; a month later, was appointed "deputy campaign manager for presidential operations" on Trump's reelection campaign. A favorite of Trump, Miller praised him as "the greatest POTUS this country has ever had." He helped organize the 2020 Republican convention and was a Trump negotiator for the presidential debates.

In 2018, Miller was one of several Trump administration officials who were scrutinized for their inexperience and lack of qualifications. Miller's LinkedIn page falsely claimed that he was a Marine recruiter and that he had graduated from college in 2011, rather than 2013. After The Washington Post raised questions about his biography, Miller removed the claims and called them mistakes made by a relative, who he said made the LinkedIn page on his behalf.

In 2020 and 2021, Miller promoted Trump's false claim that the 2020 presidential election was "rigged". In June 2021, referring to a pro-Trump mob's attack on the U.S. Capitol on January 6, 2021, Miller told The Washington Times, "What happened on January 6 was not an insurrection." In 2021, Trump appointed Miller to be one of 55 members of the board of trustees for the United States Holocaust Memorial Museum, an unpaid, part-time position. In mid-December 2021, Miller was one of six people the January 6 committee subpoenaed to produce documents relating to the rally preceding the Capitol attack and deposed in January 2022.

U.S. House of Representatives

Elections

2022 

In February 2021, Miller launched a campaign for Congress in the redrawn 7th district. The district had previously been the 16th, represented by two-term Republican Anthony Gonzalez. Miller was initially set to face Gonzalez in the Republican primary, but Gonzalez announced in September 2021 that he would not seek reelection to a third term, denouncing Trump as a "cancer for the country" and citing the likelihood of a "brutally hard primary" against Miller, family considerations, and a wave of threats against him. Miller ran after Gonzalez voted to impeach Trump for incitement of insurrection, arising from the January 6 attack on the Capitol. Miller moved back to Ohio, purchasing a home in Rocky River in order to challenge Gonzalez.

In June 2021, in his first rally since the January 6 attack, Trump appeared in Wellington, Ohio, with Miller; Trump praised Miller, repeated falsehoods about the 2020 election, and claimed the attack on the Capitol had been "mostly peaceful".

Miller won the May 3 Republican primary for Ohio's 7th Congressional district with 71.9% of the vote.

After announcing his candidacy, Miller was endorsed by Trump and the Club for Growth. He also received support from Ohio Right to Life, Ohio Value Voters, and Congressman Jim Banks. He defeated Democratic nominee Matthew Diemer in the November 8 general election.

Tenure 
On January 31, 2023, Miller introduced a resolution to remove Minnesota Representative Ilhan Omar from the Foreign Affairs Committee. The resolution passed two days later.

Caucus memberships 

 Republican Main Street Partnership

Personal life 
Miller is the grandson of Samuel H. Miller, the former co-chairman emeritus of Forest City Realty Trust. His grandmother, Ruth Miller, was a candidate for Ohio's 22nd congressional district in 1980. His uncle is Aaron David Miller, a scholar of Middle East studies.

Miller is Jewish. Trump appointed him to the Holocaust Memorial Council in December 2020.

Miller became engaged in 2021 to Emily Moreno.

Legal issues 
Miller pleaded no contest to two misdemeanor charges in 2007, after being charged with assault, disorderly conduct and resisting arrest; the charges were later dismissed as part of a diversion program. In 2009, he was charged with underage drinking; after he pleaded no contest, that charge was dismissed under a first-time offenders' program. In 2010, Miller pleaded guilty to disorderly conduct stemming from a late-night physical altercation in Cleveland Heights, Ohio. In 2011, he was charged with "operating a vehicle without reasonable control" and operating a vehicle impaired (OVI) after crashing his Jeep Laredo, and told officers that he had had "two to three beers and several shots" the night before and "woke up in urine-soaked pants". Miller pleaded guilty to a misdemeanor and failure to control. In 2018 and 2021, he called the events "youthful mistakes".

In October 2021, former White House press secretary Stephanie Grisham, who had dated Miller, said he had "been physically abusive" to her, "cheated" on her, and "lied" to her. Miller filed a defamation lawsuit against her. Judge Emily Hagan rejected Grisham's appeals to dismiss the case.

References

External links
Congressman Max Miller official U.S. House website
Max Miller for Congress
 
 

|-

1989 births
21st-century American Jews
American Jews from Ohio
Cleveland State University alumni
Jewish members of the United States House of Representatives
Jewish American people in Ohio politics
Living people
Ohio Republicans
Politicians from Shaker Heights, Ohio
Ratner family
Republican Party members of the United States House of Representatives from Ohio
University of Arizona alumni